The Association for Research into Crimes against Art (ARCA) is a research and outreach organization that works to promote research and the study of art crime and cultural heritage protection. ARCA aims to bridge the gap between the practical and theoretical by fostering collaboration between foreign and domestic law enforcement officials, security consultants, academics, lawyers, archaeologists, insurance specialists, criminologists, art historians, conservators, and others. Their goal is to raise public awareness about art related crime and to better preserve the world's collective cultural heritage.

At the grassroots level, ARCA objective is to identify emerging and under-examined trends related to the study of art crime and to develop strategies to advocate for the responsible stewardship of our collective artistic and archaeological heritage. ARCA advances this mission through educational programming, research, publications and public outreach at the national and international level to foster an exchange of knowledge in the field.

As part of this work, ARCA sponsors a Postgraduate Certificate Program in Art Crime and Cultural Heritage Protection which is held from June to August every year in Italy.  It also publishes the Journal of Art Crime, and hosts an annual academic conference on art crime and cultural heritage at risk.

Media
Dan Brown mentions ARCA and their blog in his novel Inferno (2013).  In chapter 72, Robert Langdon uses the ARCA website to check the history of the Four Horses of the Basilica San Marco, and is startled by the passage:

"The decorative collars were added to the horses' necks in 1204 by the Venetians to conceal where the heads had been severed to facilitate their transportation by ship from Constantinople to Venice."

This passage is taken from a series of four articles discussing the long and tumultuous history of the Four Horses of the Basilica San Marco, the art work with the longest history of crimes against it, written by Judge Arthur Tompkins.  Judge Tompkins is an ARCA trustee and faculty member, who teaches a course on Art Crimes in War as part of ARCA's Postgraduate Certificate Program and includes detailed discussion of the Four Horses as part of his course.

Notes

External links 
 The Association for Research into Crimes Against Art
 Postgraduate Certificate Program
 Art Crime Conference
 Related Blogs
 Related Sites

Art crime
Research organizations